Sergio Lasam Utleg, D.D., (born in Solana, Cagayan, September 11, 1943), is a prelate of the Roman Catholic Church in the Philippines.  He is the former Archbishop of Tuguegarao in Tuguegarao, Philippines. On October 18, 2019, his resignation was accepted by Pope Francis, appointing Alaminos Bishop Ricardo Baccay as his successor.

Life and church
The Most Rev. Sergio Lasam Utleg, D.D. or fondly called as "Ama Enjoe" was born 11 September 1943 in Solana, Cagayana (Philippines). He received his Philosophical and Theological Studies at the UST Central Seminary in Manila. He then obtained a MA in Sociology at the Fordham University in New York, USA in 1987 and a licentiate in theology at the Pontifical Gregorian University in Rome in 1968.

He was ordained a priest in New York, USA for then Diocese of Tuguegarao on 30 March 1968. After a few years of being a parochial vicar, he became parish priest in Cordova, Amulung from 1973 to 1987 and then, parish priest in Alcala, Cagayan until 1997. At the same time, he held positions in the office for the social pastoral care of the Archdiocese of Tuguegarao.

He was elected Coadjutor Bishop of Ilagan on 10 February 1997 by Pope John Paul II. His Episcopal Consecration was on March 17, 1997 at St. Peter's Cathedral, Tuguegarao. He then succeeded as Bishop of Ilagan on July 26, 1999 following the acceptance of the resignation of his predecessor, The Most Rev. Miguel Purugganan. Then-Bishop Utleg was appointed by Pope Benedict XVI as Bishop of Laoag on November 13, 2006 and installed as Bishop of Laoag on January 11, 2007.

Within the Episcopal Conference of the Philippines, he became President of the "Episcopal Commission on Indigenous Peoples".

Archbishop of Tuguegarao
On June 16, 2011, Pope Benedict XVI has elevated Laoag Bishop Sergio Utleg to Archbishop of Tuguegarao replacing retiring Archbishop Diosdado Talamayan. His resignation was accepted by Pope Francis on October 18, 2019, appointing Alaminos Bishop Ricardo Baccay as his successor as Archbishop of Tuguegarao.

Coat of Arms
Lifted from the Souvenir Program “ The Rite of Liturgical Reception, Eucharistic
Celebration and Canonical Possession of the Archdiocese of Tuguegarao”

His Excellency The Most Reverend Sergio Lasam Utleg, D.D., Third Metropolitan Archbishop of Tuguegarao August 12, 2011. Saint Peter Cathedral, Tuguegarao City.

The two sides of the coat of arms are divided in the middle by blue wavy lines. The right side is the personal seal of the Archbishop. The left side is the seal of the Archdiocese of Tuguegarao.

References

External links
Archbishop Sergio Lasam Utleg 
CBCP Online
Benedict promotes 3 Pinoy bishops

People from Cagayan
21st-century Roman Catholic archbishops in the Philippines
Living people
1943 births
Roman Catholic archbishops of Tuguegarao